Harry Van Dyke, also known as Harry'O The Vandizzle (born September 29, 1972) is an American actor and record producer, most known for his role as Douby in the movie Split Decisions. His music credits are the album The Camp from Lay'em Down Productions, and various other songs that he produced.

Discography

Albums

Singles

Filmography

References

Notes 

1972 births
Living people
Record producers from Michigan
American rappers
Male actors from Detroit
21st-century American rappers